Parapercis multifasciata, the  gold-bridled sandsmelt, is a fish species in the sandperch family, Pinguipedidae. The scientific name of this species was first published 1884 by Döderlein. It is found off Japan and Taiwan, a specimen collected off KwaZulu Natal in South Africa has been tentatively identified as this species.

References

Pinguipedidae
Fish of Japan
Fish of Taiwan
Taxa named by Ludwig Heinrich Philipp Döderlein
Fish described in 1884